Deirdre Susan Moir Wilson, FBA (born 1941) is a British linguist and cognitive scientist. She is emeritus professor of Linguistics at University College London and research professor at the Centre for the Study of Mind in Nature at the University of Oslo. Her most influential work has been in linguistic pragmatics—specifically in the development of Relevance Theory with French anthropologist Dan Sperber. This work has been especially influential in the Philosophy of Language. Important influences on Wilson are Noam Chomsky, Jerry Fodor, and Paul Grice. Linguists and philosophers of language who have been students of Wilson include Stephen Neale (CUNY Graduate Center), and Robyn Carston (University College London).

Biography

Wilson completed her Bachelor of Philosophy at the University of Oxford while working with philosopher H. P. Grice. She completed her PhD (Doctor of Philosophy) at the Massachusetts Institute of Technology with linguist Noam Chomsky as her dissertation advisor. She was a lecturer at Somerville College, Oxford.

Work

Wilson's work is in linguistic pragmatics. Pragmatics is the study of how contextual factors interact with linguistic meaning in the interpretation of utterances. Her 1975 book Presuppositions and Non-Truth-Conditional Semantics advocated a pragmatic approach to presuppositions. In her longstanding collaboration with French Anthropologist Dan Sperber she has published many books and articles over 30 years. Their 1986 book Relevance: Communication and Cognition laid the foundation for Relevance Theory which they have continued to develop in subsequent books and articles.

Relevance Theory is, roughly, the theory that the aim of an interpreter is to find an interpretation of the speaker's meaning that satisfies the presumption of optimal relevance. An input is relevant to an individual when it connects with available contextual assumptions to yield positive cognitive effects.

Publications
Novel
Wilson, D. Slave of the Passions. Picador. 1992.

Academic Books
Wilson, D. Presuppositions and Non-Truth-Conditional Semantics. Academic Press. 1975.
Sperber, D. & Wilson, D. Relevance: Communication and Cognition. Oxford University Press. 1986.
Wilson, D. & Sperber, D. Meaning and Relevance. Cambridge University Press. 2012.

Academic Articles
Dan Sperber & Deirdre Wilson, (2009) A Deflationary Account of Metaphor.
Deirdre Wilson & Robyn Carston, (2007) Concepts.
Deirdre Wilson & Robyn Carston (2006). Metaphor, Relevance and the 'Emergent Property' Issue.    
Dan Sperber & Deirdre Wilson (2002). Pragmatics, Modularity and Mind-Reading.
Deirdre Wilson & Dan Sperber (2002). Truthfulness and Relevance.

References

1941 births
Living people
20th-century English novelists
21st-century English writers
20th-century British women writers
21st-century British women writers
20th-century linguists
21st-century linguists
20th-century British philosophers
21st-century British philosophers
20th-century American women scientists
21st-century American women scientists
Academics of University College London
Alumni of the University of Oxford
Linguists from the United Kingdom
British women novelists
British cognitive scientists
Massachusetts Institute of Technology School of Science alumni
Noam Chomsky
Philosophers of language
Academic staff of the University of Oslo
Women cognitive scientists
Women linguists
Fellows of Somerville College, Oxford